Diki is a village in the Bamingui-Bangoran Prefecture in the northern Central African Republic.

Diki may also refer to:

Diki-Diki (cocktail), a cocktail made with calvados, Swedish Punsch, and grapefruit juice

People with the name
Diki Tsering ( – 1981), mother of three reincarnated Rinpoches/Lamas
Pema Diki Sherpa (born 1988), Nepalese mountain climber

See also
Tibetan name